CHINICT (Simplified Chinese: 科技明星在中国 - literally meaning "Tech Stars In China") is a conference including a Hackathon focused on the China tech innovation and entrepreneurship ecosystem. CHINICT takes place once a year at the end of May in Beijing at Tsinghua University Science Park.

Since 2005, CHINICT has been featuring policy-makers, financiers, entrepreneurs, innovators and technologists both from China and the West.

CHINICT was acquired by GSMA.

Franck Nazikian
The conference was founded in 2005  by Franck Nazikian (Simplified Chinese: 方克纳), a tech entrepreneur and investor. He is the CEO & co-founder of WowTune, a company focused on creating VR singing and spoken voices, and several other Web3 enterprises. Together with Renaud Laplanche, Franck co-founded TripleHop Technologies, acquired by Oracle. Franck also served as a managing director at Gemplus International, making venture capital investments in tech companies, and runs DEVELOPNEUR, a series of pitch competitions & hackathons which he created in 2011.

References

External links 

Annual events in Beijing
Software development events
Web-related conferences
Trade fairs in China
Technology conferences